Highly Innovative Fuels Australia (HIF) is a carbon neutral synthetic fuel development program operated by German automaker Porsche AG and international eFuel company HIF Global. The program was announced in April 2022, with the announcement of the first manufacturing and research plant in the state of Tasmania coming in July of that year, said plant is set to open in 2026.

References

 
Volkswagen Group
Alternative fuels
Renewable fuels
Synthetic fuels
2022 establishments in Australia
Australian companies established in 2022
Companies based in Tasmania